The Loch of Skaill  is a small somewhat triangular, freshwater loch in the parish of Sandwick, Orkney on Mainland Orkney, Scotland.

The loch is popular for trout fishing and is reserved for use by members of The Orkney Trout Fishing Association only.

The loch was surveyed in 1906 by James Murray and later charted as part of The Bathymetrical Survey of Fresh-Water Lochs of Scotland 1897–1909.  A small burn at the north western shore drains the loch in to the Bay of Skaill and was noted in the Survey that it was used as a mill stream.

References

Skaill
Skaill
Skaill